Rhizomnium is a genus of mosses in the family Mniaceae commonly referred to as leafy mosses. They grow nearly worldwide, mostly in the northern hemisphere.

Species
 Rhizomnium andrewsianum
 Rhizomnium appalachianum
 Rhizomnium glabrescens
 Rhizomnium gracile
 Rhizomnium horikawae
 Rhizomnium magnifolium
 Rhizomnium nudum
 Rhizomnium pseudopunctatum
 Rhizomnium punctatum
 Rhizomnium striatulum

Fossil species:
 Rhizomnium dentatum

References

 
Moss genera